Serine/threonine-protein kinase N2 is an enzyme that in humans and Strongylocentrotus purpuratus is encoded by the PKN2 gene.

Interactions 

PKN2 has been shown to interact with:

 AKT1, 
 NCK1, 
 PTPN13, 
 Phosphoinositide-dependent kinase-1,  and
 RHOA.

Further reading

References

EC 2.7.11